Louis XVII (born Louis Charles, Duke of Normandy; 27 March 1785 – 8 June 1795) was the younger son of King Louis XVI of France and Queen Marie Antoinette. His older brother, Louis Joseph, Dauphin of France, died in June 1789, a little over a month before the start of the French Revolution. At his brother's death he became the new Dauphin (heir apparent to the throne), a title he held until 1791, when the new constitution accorded the heir apparent the title of Prince Royal.

When his father was executed on 21 January 1793, during the middle period of the French Revolution, he automatically succeeded as the king of France, Louis XVII, in the eyes of the royalists. France was by then a republic and since Louis-Charles  was imprisoned and died in captivity in June 1795, he never actually ruled. Nevertheless, in 1814  after the Bourbon Restoration, his uncle acceded to the throne and was proclaimed Louis XVIII.

Biography

Louis-Charles de France was born at the Palace of Versailles, the second son and third child of his parents, Louis XVI and Marie Antoinette. He was named after his father and his mother's favourite sister Maria Carolina, Queen of Naples and Sicily, who was known as Charlotte in the family, Charles being the masculine version of her name. His younger sister, Sophie, was born a little over a year later. He became the Dauphin on the death of his elder brother, Louis Joseph, on 4 June 1789.

As customary in royal families, Louis-Charles was cared for by multiple people. Queen Marie Antoinette appointed governesses to look after all three of her children. Louis-Charles' original governess was Yolande de Polastron, Duchesse de Polignac, who left France on the night of 16–17 July 1789, at the outbreak of the Revolution, at the urging of Louis XVI. She was replaced by the marquise Louise Élisabeth de Tourzel.  Additionally, the queen selected Agathe de Rambaud to be the official nurse of Louis-Charles. Alain Decaux wrote: "Madame de Rambaud was officially in charge of the care of the Dauphin from the day of his birth until 10 August 1792; in other words, for seven years. During these seven years, she never left him, she cradled him, took care of him, dressed him, comforted him, and scolded him. Many times, more than Marie Antoinette, she was a true mother for him".

Some have suggested that Axel von Fersen, who was romantically linked with Marie Antoinette, was the father of her son.  The fact that Louis Charles was born exactly nine months after he returned to court was noted, but this theory was debunked by most scholars, who reject it, observing that the time of his conception corresponded perfectly in the time that Louis XVI and Marie Antoinette had spent a lot of time together. Marie Antoinette, who gained massive weight because of her pregnancies, including this one (she was described as "very fat" by the king of Sweden), retained her charisma with an imposing figure in her court, where she had lot of admirers, but she remained a faithful, strong-willed wife and a stern but ultimately loving mother.

On 6 October 1789, the royal family was forced by a Parisian mob mostly composed of women to move from Versailles to the Tuileries Palace in Paris, where they spent the next three years as prisoners under the daily surveillance of the national guards who did not spare any humiliation to the family; at that time Marie Antoinette was always surrounded by guards, even in her bedroom at night and these guards were present when the Queen was allowed to see her children.

The family lived a secluded life, and Marie Antoinette dedicated most of her time to her two children under the daily surveillance of the national guards who kept her hands behind her back and searched everybody from the Queen to the children to see if any letters were smuggled to the prisoner. In 1790, the queen adopted a foster sibling for him, "Zoë" Jeanne Louise Victoire, as a playmate.   On 21 June 1791, the family tried to escape in what is known as the Flight to Varennes, but the attempt failed. After the family was recognized, they were brought back to Paris. When the Tuileries Palace was stormed by an armed mob on 10 August 1792, the royal family sought refuge at the Legislative Assembly.

On 13 August, the royal family was imprisoned in the tower of the Temple. At first, their conditions were not extremely harsh, but they were prisoners and were re-styled as the  "Capets" by the newborn Republic. On 11 December, at the beginning of his trial, Louis XVI was separated from his family.

Naming
At his birth, Louis-Charles, a Fils de France ("Son of France"), was given the title of Duke of Normandy, and, on 4 June 1789, when Louis Joseph, Dauphin of France, his elder brother, died, the four-year-old became Dauphin of France, a title he held until September 1791, when France became a constitutional monarchy. Under the new constitution, the heir-apparent to the throne of France, formerly referred to as the "Dauphin", was restyled the Prince Royal. Louis-Charles held that title until the fall of the monarchy on 21 September 1792. At the death of his father on 21 January 1793, royalists and foreign powers intent on restoring the monarchy held him to be the new king of France, with the title of Louis XVII. From his exile in Hamm, in today's North Rhine-Westphalia, his uncle, the Count of Provence and future Louis XVIII, who had emigrated on 21 June 1791, appointed himself Regent for the young imprisoned king.

Prison and rumours of escape

1793: In the care of Antoine Simon

Others said to be involved in his escape(s) are Paul Barras and Josephine Beauharnais.

On 3 July, Louis-Charles was separated from his mother and put in the care of Antoine Simon, a cobbler who had been named his guardian by the Committee of Public Safety.

The tales told by royalist writers of the cruelty inflicted by Simon and his wife on the child have not been proved. Louis Charles' sister, Marie Therese, wrote in her memoires about the "monster Simon", as did Alcide Beauchesne. Antoine Simon's wife Marie-Jeanne, in fact, took great care of the child's person. Stories survive narrating how he was encouraged to eat and drink to excess and learned the language of the gutter. The foreign secretaries of Britain and Spain also heard accounts from their spies that the boy was raped by prostitutes in order to infect him with venereal diseases to supply the Commune with manufactured "evidence" against the Queen.

On 6 October, Pache, Chaumette, Jacques Hébert and others visited the boy and secured his signature to charges of sexual molestation against his mother and his aunt. The next day he met his elder sister Marie-Thérèse-Charlotte for the last time.

1794: Illness
On 19 January 1794, the Simons left the Temple, after securing a receipt for the safe transfer of their ward, who was declared to be in good health. A large part of the Temple records from that time onward disappeared under the Bourbon Restoration, making ascertaining of the facts impossible.  Two days after the departure of the Simons, Louis-Charles is said by the Restoration historians to have been put in a dark room that was barricaded like the cage of a wild animal. The story recounts that food was passed through the bars to the boy, who survived despite the accumulated filth of his surroundings.

Robespierre visited Marie-Thérèse on 11 May, but no one, according to the legend, entered the boy's room for six months until Barras visited the prison after the 9th Thermidor (27 July 1794). Barras's account of the visit describes the child as suffering from extreme neglect, but conveys no idea of the alleged walling-in.  

The boy made no complaint to Barras of any ill treatment. He was then cleaned and re-clothed. His room was cleaned, and during the day he was visited by his new attendant,  (1770–1807), a creole from Martinique. From 8 November onward, Laurent had assistance from a man named Gomin.

Louis-Charles was then taken out for fresh air and walks on the roof of the Tower. From about the time of Gomin's arrival, he was inspected, not by delegates of the Commune, but by representatives of the civil committee of the 48 sections of Paris.  From the end of October onward, the child maintained silence, explained by Laurent as a determination taken on the day he made his deposition against his mother.  On 19 December 1794, he was visited by three commissioners from the Committee of Public Safety — , J. B. C. Mathieu and  — but they failed to get the boy to say anything at all.

1795: Death

On 31 March 1795,  was appointed to be the child's guardian in place of Laurent. In May that year the boy was seriously ill, and a doctor, P. J. Desault, who had visited him seven months earlier, was summoned. However, on 1 June, Desault himself died suddenly, not without suspicion of poison, and it was some days before doctors Philippe-Jean Pelletan and Jean-Baptiste Dumangin were called.

Louis-Charles died on 8 June 1795. The next day an autopsy was conducted by Pelletan. In the report it was stated that a child apparently about 10 years of age, "which the commissioners told us was the late Louis Capet's son", had died of a scrofulous infection of long standing.  "Scrofula" as it was previously known, is nowadays called Tuberculous cervical lymphadenitis referring to a lymphadenitis (chronic lymph node swelling or infection) of the neck (cervical lymph nodes) lymph nodes associated with tuberculosis. During the autopsy, the physician Dr. Pelletan was shocked to see the countless scars which covered the boy's body, evidently the result of the physical mistreatment which the child had suffered while imprisoned in the Temple.

Louis-Charles was buried on 10 June in the Sainte Marguerite cemetery, but no stone was erected to mark the spot. A skull was found there in 1846 and identified as his, though later re-examination in 1893 showed it to be from a teenager and therefore unlikely to be his.

Heart of Louis-Charles 

Following a tradition of preserving royal hearts, Louis-Charles's heart was removed and smuggled out during the autopsy by the overseeing physician, Philippe-Jean Pelletan. Thus, Louis-Charles' heart was not interred with the rest of the body. Dr. Pelletan stored the smuggled heart in distilled wine in order to preserve it. However, after 8 to 10 years the distilled wine had evaporated, and the heart was from that time kept dry.

After the Restoration in 1815, Dr. Pelletan attempted to give the heart to Louis-Charles's uncle, Louis XVIII; the latter refused because he could not bring himself to believe that was the heart of his nephew. Dr. Pelletan then donated the heart to the Archbishop of Paris, Hyacinthe-Louis de Quélen.

Following the Revolution of 1830, and the plundering of the Archbishop's palace, Pelletan's son found the relic among the ruins and placed it in the crystal urn in which it is still kept today. After the younger Pelletan's death in 1879, it passed to Éduard Dumont. Dumont died in 1895, and the heart came into the possession of Dumont's cousin, the French historian Paul Cottin (1856-1932).

Cottin offered it to Don Carlos de Bourbon, a pretender to the throne of Spain,  nephew of the Archduchess Maria Theresa of Austria-Este. The offer was accepted and the relic was held near Vienna, Austria at the castle of Frohsdorf. In 1909, Carlos's son, Jaime, Duke of Madrid, inherited the heart, and gave it to his sister, the Infanta Beatriz of Spain. It later passed to Jaime’s  daughter, the princess Beatrice de Bourbon (1874–1961), wife of Prince Fabrizio Massimo (1868–1944), and in 1938, to the princess Infanta Maria das Neves of Portugal, legitimist heir to the throne of France.

Finally two granddaughters of Don Carlos offered the heart to the Duc de Bauffremont, president of the Memorial of the Basilica of St Denis in Paris. He in turn put the heart and its crystal urn in the basilica's necropolis of the Kings of France, the burial place of Louis-Charles's parents and other members of the French royal family.

There it rested undisturbed until December 1999, when public notaries witnessed the removal of a section of the muscle of the heart's aorta and its transfer into a sealed envelope, and subsequently the opening of the same sealed envelope in the laboratory for it to be tested.

It was in 2000 that the historian Philippe Delorme arranged for DNA testing of the heart as well as bone samples from one of the many historical claimants to Louis-Charles's identity, namely, Karl Wilhelm Naundorff, a German clockmaker.  Ernst Brinkmann of Münster University and Belgian genetics professor Jean-Jacques Cassiman of the Katholieke Universiteit Leuven, conducted mitochondrial DNA tests using a strand of the hair of the boy's mother, Marie-Antoinette, and other samples from her sisters Maria Johanna Gabriela and Maria Josepha, their mother, Empress Maria Theresa, and two living direct descendants in the strict maternal line of Maria Theresa, namely Queen Anne of Romania and her brother, Prince André de Bourbon Parme, maternal relatives of Louis XVII. The tests proved both that Naundorff was not the dauphin, and the heart was that of Louis-Charles.

Of these results, historian Jean Tulard wrote: "This [mummified] heart is ... almost certainly that of Louis XVII. We can never be 100 per cent sure but this is about as sure as it gets".

In the light of this conclusion, French Legitimists organized the heart's solemn burial in the St Denis Basilica on 8 June 2004. The burial took place in connection with a Mass and during the ceremony 12-year-old Prince Amaury de Bourbon-Parme carried the heart and placed it in a niche beside the tombs of Louis-Charles' parents, Louis XVI and Marie-Antoinette. 
It was the first time in over a century that a royal ceremony had taken place in France, complete with the fleur-de-lis standard and a royal crown.

Lost Dauphin claimants
As rumors quickly spread that the body buried was not that of Louis-Charles and that he had been spirited away alive by sympathizers, the legend of the "Lost Dauphin" was born. When the Bourbon monarchy was restored in 1814, some one hundred claimants came forward.  Would-be royal heirs continued to appear across Europe for decades afterward.

Naundorff
Karl Wilhelm Naundorff was a German clockmaker whose story rested on a series of complicated intrigues.  According to him, Barras determined to save the dauphin in order to please Joséphine de Beauharnais, the future empress, having conceived the idea of using the dauphin's existence as a means of dominating the comte de Provence in the event of a restoration. The dauphin was concealed in the fourth storey of the Tower, a wooden figure being substituted for him. Laurent, to protect himself from the consequences of the substitution, replaced the wooden figure with a deaf mute, who was presently exchanged for the scrofulous child of the death certificate. The deaf mute was also concealed in the Temple. It was not the dead child, but the dauphin who left the prison in the coffin, to be retrieved by friends before it reached the cemetery.

Naundorff arrived in Berlin in 1810, with papers giving the name Karl Wilhelm Naundorff. He said he was escaping persecution and settled at Spandau in 1812 as a clockmaker, marrying Johanna Einert in 1818. In 1822 he removed to Brandenburg an der Havel, and in 1828 to Crossen, near Frankfurt (Oder). He was imprisoned from 1825 to 1828 for coining, though apparently on insufficient evidence, and in 1833 came to push his claims in Paris, where he was recognized as the dauphin by many persons formerly connected with the court of Louis XVI. Expelled from France in 1836, the day after bringing a suit against the duchess of Angoulême for the restitution of the dauphin's private property, he lived in exile until his death at Delft on 10 August 1845, and his tomb was inscribed "Louis XVII., roi de France et de Navarre (Charles Louis, duc de Normandie)". The Dutch authorities who had inscribed on his death certificate the name of Charles Louis de Bourbon, duc de Normandie (Louis XVII) permitted his son to bear the name de Bourbon, and when the family appealed in 1850–51, and again in 1874, for the restitution of their civil rights as heirs of Louis XVI, no less an advocate than Jules Favre pled their cause.

However, DNA testing conducted in 1993 proved that Naundorff was not the Dauphin.

Richemont
Baron de Richemont's tale that Jeanne Simon, who was genuinely attached to him, smuggled him out in a basket, is simple and more credible, and does not necessarily invalidate the story of the subsequent operations with the deaf mute and the scrofulous patient, Laurent in that case being deceived from the beginning, but it renders them extremely unlikely.

Richemont, alias Henri Éthelbert-Louis-Hector Hébert, began to put forward his claims in Paris in 1828. He died in 1853.

Williams
Reverend Eleazer Williams was a Protestant missionary from Wisconsin of Mohawk Native American descent. While at the house Francis Vinton, William began shaking and trembling upon seeing a portrait of Antoine Simon, a member of the sans-culottes, saying of the portrait that it had "haunted me, day, and night, as long as I can remember." Simon was rumored to have physically abused the dauphin while he was imprisoned at the Temple. Francis Vinton was convinced by Eleazar William's reaction that Williams was Louis-Charles. Williams claimed he had no recollection of how he escaped his imprisonment at the Temple, or of his early years in France.

Williams was a missionary to Native Americans when, according to him, the prince de Joinville, son of Louis-Philippe, met him, and after some conversation asked him to sign a document abdicating his rights in favor of Louis-Philippe, in return for which he, the dauphin (alias Eleazar Williams), was to receive the private inheritance which was his. This Eleazar Williams refused. Williams's story is generally regarded as false. However, other elements published in 1897 provide some grounds for doubt.

Burial

Louis XVII's remains were not interred with ceremony. "At seven o'clock the police commissary ordered the body to be taken up, and that they should proceed to the cemetery. It was the season of the longest days, and therefore the interment did not take place in secrecy and at night, as some misinformed narrators have said or written; it took place in broad daylight, and attracted a great concourse of people before the gates of the Temple palace." Added, "The funeral entered the cemetery of Sainte Marguerite, not by the church, as some accounts assert, but by the old gate of the cemetery. The interment was made in the corner, on the left, at a distance of eight or nine feet from the enclosure wall, and at an equal distance from a small house, which subsequently served as a school. The grave was filled up,—no mound marked its place, and not even a trace remained of the interment! Not till then did the commissaries of police and the municipality withdraw, and enter the house opposite the church to draw up the declaration of interment."

Conclusion
Strangely, the account of the substitution in the Temple deceived royalists and republicans alike. Lady Atkyns was trying by every possible means to get the dauphin out of his prison when he may already have been in safe hands. A child was in fact delivered to her agents, but he was a deaf mute.  When the partisans of Richemont or Naundorff come to recount details of the post-Temple careers of their heroes, their assertions become in most cases so uncritical as to be unconvincing.

By 1900, there were over 100 pretenders who had presented themselves to be the "lost dauphin".  The popularity of the false dauphins peaked in the wake of the 1830 Revolution, and waned over the course of the century.  Unlike the deaths of his parents, which were a national spectacle, the dauphin's death was a matter of administrative and medical record, and consequently easier to repudiate. The myth of the substitution of Louis-Charles before death  was popularized and encouraged by Jean-Joseph Regnault Warin's immensely popular novel Le Cimetière de la Madeleine in 1800.  Pretenders increased in regularity after the accession of King Louis XVIII during the Bourbon Restoration.  Following the Revolution of 1830, claims by pretenders were treated with heightened seriousness in France because of their ability to serve as critiques of King Louis-Philippe.  The possibility of a Bourbon claimant being able to challenge Louis-Phillppe's legitimacy, was certainly the reason for the aggressive pursuit of the pretenders through the courts.

Royalists were able to reverse the child abuse claims with which the Revolution had charged Marie-Antoinette during her trial, directing them at the Revolution itself, for harming Louis-Charles.

In fiction

Novel
 1884 – Mark Twain, Adventures of Huckleberry Finn,  (a character falsely claiming to be him)
 1913 – Baroness Emmuska Orczy, Eldorado, 
 1937 – Rafael Sabatini, The Lost King, 
 1951 – Dennis Wheatley, The Man Who Killed The King, 
 1953 – Willa Gibbs, Seed of Mischief, 
 1955 – Carley Dawson, Dragon Run
 2000 – Deborah Cadbury, The Lost King of France: A true story of revolution, revenge, and DNA, 
 2003 – Françoise Chandernagor, La Chambre, éditions Gallimard, 
 2003 – Amélie de Bourbon Parme, Le Sacre de Louis XVII, éditions Folio, 
 2005 – Ann Dukthas, En Mémoire d'un prince, éditions 10/18, Grands Détectives, 
 2007 – Christophe Donner, Un roi sans lendemain, éditions Grasset, 
 2009 – Dominic Lagan, Live Free or Die, 
 2010 – Jennifer Donnelly, Revolution, 
 2011 – Louis Bayard, The Black Tower, 
 2011 – Jacques Soppelsa, Louis XVII, la piste argentine, Histoires, A2C Médias, 
 2011 – Missouri Dalton, The Grave Watchers,

Cinema
 1937 – Le roi sans couronne played by Scotty Beckett
 1938 – La Marseillaise played by Marie-Pierre Sordet-Dantès
 1938 – Marie Antoinette played by Scotty Beckett
 1945 – Pamela played by Serge Emrich
 1957 – Dangerous Exile played by Richard O'Sullivan
 1982 – The Scarlet Pimpernel played by Richard Charles
 1989 – La Révolution française played by Sean Flynn
 1991 – Killer Tomatoes Eat France played by Steve Lundquist.
 1995 – Jefferson in Paris played by Damien Groelle
 2001 – The Affair of the Necklace played by Thomas Dodgson-Gates
 2006 – Marie Antoinette played by Jago Betts, Axel Küng, Driss Hugo-Kalff

Music
 2014 – Symphony of the Vampire by Kamijo
 2018 – Sang by Kamijo

Exhibition
From 29 June to 1 October 2018 the Museum of the French Revolution showed an exhibition on Louis XVII.

See also

 Alexei Nikolaevich, heir to the Russian Empire; imprisoned and killed by the Bolsheviks in the Russian Civil War
 Arthur I, Duke of Brittany, boy claimant to the English throne; alleged to have been murdered by his uncle King John
 Edward V of England and Richard of Shrewsbury, Duke of York, the Princes in the Tower who vanished towards the end of the Wars of the Roses; alleged to have been murdered by their uncle Richard III

References

Further reading
 Cadbury, Deborah. The Lost King of France: Revolution, Revenge and the Search for Louis XVII. London: Fourth Estate, 2002 (hardcover), 2003 (paperback); New York: St. Martin's Press, 2002 (hardcover); New York: St. Martin's Griffin, 2003 (paperback reprint). (Note that subtitles vary in different editions of the book.)
 Reviewed by Hilary Mantel in the London Review of Books, Vol. 25, No. 8, 17 August 2003.
 'Live Free or Die' (historical thriller novel) by Dominic Lagan , Editions Gigouzac 2009 paperback
 Alcide Beauchesne "Louis 17. Sa vie, martyr et agonie" 1852. Plon. Paris.

External links

Primary sources
  Duchess of Angoulême's Memoirs on the Captivity in the Temple (from the autograph manuscript)
 Duchess of Angoulême's Memoirs on the Captivity in the Temple (1823 English translation of a slightly redacted French edition)

Other material
  Philippe Delorme's website (one page in English).
  Details about the DNA analysis of the heart believed to be that of Louis-Charles.
 
 "FRANCE SET TO BURY ROYAL AFTER 209 YEARS", New York Post, 8 December 2003. 

|-

 
1785 births
1795 deaths
18th-century Dukes of Normandy
Courtesy dukes
French Roman Catholics
Dauphins of France
Grand Crosses of the Order of Saint Louis
Knights of the Golden Fleece
People from Versailles
18th-century deaths from tuberculosis
French people who died in prison custody
Tuberculosis deaths in France
Burials at the Basilica of Saint-Denis
Princes of France (Bourbon)
French children
Disappeared princes
Mummies
People who died in prison custody during the French Revolution
Pretenders to the French throne
Navarrese titular monarchs
Children of Louis XVI
Legitimist pretenders to the French throne
Royal reburials
Heirs apparent who never acceded